Stone Hall was a building on the campus of Cornell University in Ithaca, New York, named after John Lemuel Stone, a CALS professor of farm practice during the early 1900s. Stone, Roberts, and East Roberts Hall were three joined buildings on the Agriculture Quadrangle, with the larger Roberts in the center and Stone and East Roberts on the west and east sides, respectively. All three were demolished in the late 1980s.

It was listed on the U.S. National Register of Historic Places in 1984. It is still listed on the National Register.

See also
 Roberts Hall
 East Robert Hall

References

Cornell University buildings
School buildings on the National Register of Historic Places in New York (state)
University and college buildings on the National Register of Historic Places in New York (state)
National Register of Historic Places in Tompkins County, New York